Sam Thomas may refer to:

 Sam Thomas (campaigner) (born 1986), campaigner for men living with eating disorders
 Sam Thomas (jockey) (born 1984), Welsh jockey
 Sam Fan Thomas, Cameroonian musician
 Sam Thomas (basketball), professional women's basketball player

See also
 Samuel Thomas (disambiguation)